Ngazun Township is a township of Myingyan District in the Mandalay Division of Burma. Its capital is Ngazun.

Townships of Mandalay Region